Renas may refer to:

Places
Rena, Badajoz, a municipality in Extremadura, Spain
Rena, Norway, a village in Innlandet county, Norway
Rena, Washington, a community in Clallam County, Washington, United States

People
Rena (given name), list of people with this name

Rena (footballer), a Portuguese footballer

Other uses
MV Rena, a container ship that ran aground off New Zealand in 2011, resulting in an oil spill
Rena (snake), a genus of blind snakes in the family Leptotyphlopidae
Rena (film)

See also
Reina (disambiguation)
Reyna (disambiguation)